Terri Lee Hoffman (March 21, 1938 – October 31, 2015), later known as Terri Lilya Keanely, was an American religious cult leader known for the unexplained deaths of some of her followers, including two husbands, shortly after they had willed their possessions to her. The devotees in her Dallas-based new religious movement, Conscious Development of Body, Mind and Soul, fought against the "black lords" on various planes of existence and protected themselves with powerful gems. The goal was joining God and the twelve "masters" through reincarnation in the spiritual realm. A four-year investigation by Dallas district attorney's office failed to produce evidence tying Hoffman to the deaths, but she was later sentenced to prison for bankruptcy fraud.

Biography

Early life and career
Hoffman was born to poverty and sent to a Lutheran orphanage at nine. She was adopted two years later and renamed Terri Lee Benson. Hoffman married truck driver John Wilder in 1953 and had her daughter Cathy in 1954, her son Kenneth in 1958 and another daughter, Virginia, in 1963. She was committed to the Parkland Hospital for psychiatric evaluation during divorce proceedings in 1971, but got custody of the oldest child. In the 1950s, Hoffman became interested in meditation, metaphysics, hypnotism, Silva Mind Control and the writings of Edgar Cayce. After attracting a number of followers in the late 1960s, she incorporated her movement as Conscious Development of Body, Mind and Soul in 1974, selling lessons and private "consultations".

Hoffman also started a jewelry business, incorporating it as CD Gems. Followers were instructed to buy expensive, handmade jewelry that she would turn into powerful, protective gems. By the mid-1970s, over a hundred people attended the weekly lectures in Dallas, Texas, and many more took Hoffman's printed lessons. She claimed herself the reincarnation of Saint Teresa of Ávila as her inner circle waged war against the "black lords" on several planes of existence. Aiding them were God and the twelve "masters" such as Jesus who were visible to Hoffman. She also said that she could communicate with the dead and see the past and the future. Hoffman taught her followers to avoid critical thoughts, "negative energies", as they could prove fatal. However, death was not to be feared as the ultimate goal was rebirth in the spiritual realm.

Deaths in the cult
In late 1976, Hoffman's second husband Glenn Cooley wanted out of the cult and his marriage to Terri. He was discovered dead of an overdose of valium and librium in February 1977, five days after the divorce was finalized. Hoffman produced Cooley's will from her safe, naming her the sole beneficiary, and her group saw the tragedy as proof that the black lords were making gains and poisoning the blood. The cure was draining the poison through bloodletting, which caused many members to leave the movement. Thirteen years later, a former high-ranking follower told investigators that Hoffman had said to her that Cooley was "going to the next level", and that the two had visited him at his cabin the night before his death but after he had ingested the drugs. Five months after Cooley's death, Hoffman married Ben Johnson but divorced him in 1980. Her meditation classes were reportedly attracting hundreds at the turn of the 1980s, and Conscious Development began expanding into Chicago, Illinois.

In February 1979, Hoffman's secretary-treasurer Sandra "Sandy" Cleaver went on a vacation with her daughter Susan Devereaux, whom she had previously kept distance from because Devereaux's "evil spirits" were infecting her energies. Devereaux drowned while the two went rafting, and soon the 14-year-old's will was delivered to her father Chuck Cleaver. Her $125,000 trust fund was left to the cult, but the document was invalid as wills written by minors were not legal in Texas. Sandy Cleaver took a $300,000 life insurance policy to the sole benefit of Hoffman and also transferred title of her house to her guru, paying Hoffman rent to live in her own home. In September 1981, Cleaver drove her station wagon straight off a mountain, killing herself and her 77-year-old housekeeper Louise "Weasie" Watson who had been reluctant to join the trip. Three months before their deaths, both women had updated their wills naming Hoffman as the sole beneficiary. Cleaver's brother Croom Beatty IV contested the will and his lawyer James Barklow called it the result of fraud and "undue influence". The case was settled but Hoffman and her movement were faced with bad publicity. Three of the four followers who testified on Hoffman's behalf would later commit suicide. By the mid-1980s, Hoffman had founded the perfume mixing company Perfume Oils International and begun performing acupressure massages.

Robin Otstott, whom Hoffman had matched with an invisible CIA agent named George, believed that her non-physical "bodies" were working against her and that her best friend Tamara Taylor's invisible CIA lover Martin was threatening her life. On April 19, 1987, she told her former husband that she had terminal viral hepatitis but was persuaded to see a doctor. Two days later, after visiting Hoffman, Otstott killed herself with .38-caliber revolver. Her blood tests later showed no signs of diseases.

In November 1987, Chicago follower Mary Levinson was found dead from a drug overdose. $125,000 in cash was missing and she had changed her life insurance policy less than two weeks before her death. The new beneficiary was her former boyfriend Larry Keyes whom she had met through Hoffman. Terri Hoffman's fourth husband Don Hoffman, who had fallen out of favor in the movement, was discovered dead from a "mixed drug intoxication" in September 1988. In his legal pad, Don cited his terminal, inoperable cancer as the reason for his suicide. The autopsy found no traces of cancer. Terri explained to Don's son Rick that the black lords had hidden the evidence of cancer behind an illusion. She was the sole beneficiary of her husband's estate. Rick and his sister Janet filed a wrongful death lawsuit against Terri in March 1989.

Four days after Don Hoffman's death, former cult devotee Jill Bounds was beaten to death in her home. The killer had browsed through her 1979 diary and ripped out some of the pages. Bounds had left the movement in 1982 but, despite being afraid of her, visited Terri Hoffman a few months before her death, which caused police to look for a connection. In June 1989, long-time followers David and Glenda Goodman marked in their journal that they had received instructions from God to practice shooting. Four months later, God announced that "the way is clear to get high energies. It's like this: You are about to be joined in a marriage between your phys self & your spirit. All is in readiness. The date is set for Oct 20..." The Goodmans were found dead in late November, five weeks after dying in a ritualistic double death.

Investigation and later life
Spurred by news reports about the Goodmans and the pattern of deaths that followed Hoffman, a criminal investigation was launched by the Dallas district attorney's office in January 1990. Assistant District Attorney Cecil Emerson stated that it would be difficult to determine if mind control could legally be a contributing factor in a death. Hoffman and Conscious Development denied any wrongdoing. Hoffman's lawyer, Fred Time, referred to the investigation as a witch-hunt and praised his client's persona. After four years, prosecutors could not find evidence linking Hoffman to the deaths.

Hoffman filed for bankruptcy in October 1991, and she was sentenced to 16 months in prison for ten counts of bankruptcy fraud in May 1994. She was released after serving a year.

In 1995, the TV series Unsolved Mysteries featured an episode on the mysterious disappearance of Hoffman follower Charles Southern.

Hoffman later married Roger Keanely and changed her name to Terri Lilya Keanely. She started a website touting her experience and many talents and wrote a financial advice book.

Publications

Sources

References

1938 births
2015 deaths
20th-century American criminals
20th-century American writers
Cult leaders
Founders of new religious movements
People from Dallas
People from Fort Stockton, Texas
Religious leaders from Texas
Suspected serial killers